Ketty Kerviel, real name Antoinette Verenghien (2 May 1916 - 14 November 2009), was a French actress.

Filmography 
 1939 : Yamilé sous les cèdres by Charles d'Espinay
 1945 : La Grande Meute by Jean de Limur
 1947 : Les Trois Cousines by Jacques Daniel-Norman
 1948 : Le Diamant de cent sous by Jacques Daniel-Norman
 1948 : Si ça peut vous faire plaisir by Jacques Daniel-Norman
 1949 : The Red Angel by Jacques Daniel-Norman
 1951 : Dakota 308  by Jacques Daniel-Norman
 1952 : Son dernier Noël by Jacques Daniel-Norman

External links 
 
 Ketty Kerviel sur unifrance.org

French actresses
People from Périgueux
1916 births
2009 deaths
20th-century French women